Dr. Mahendra Reddy is a Fijian politician and former Member of the Parliament of Fiji. He served as the Minister for Agriculture, Waterways and Environment from 2017 to 2022.

Reddy was an award-winning scholarship student at the University of the South Pacific and the University of Hawaii. He did his Master of Science Degree and PhD in Agriculture and Resource Economics on a Fulbright Scholarship on an East-West Centre Fellowship at the University of Hawaii. He taught Economics at the University of the South Pacific, becoming a Lecturer in Development Studies in 1998 and getting promoted to Senior lecturer in 2005. In 2007, he became the Associate Dean of the Faculty of Business and Economics and Associate Professor of Economics. In 2008, he became the Head of the USP School of Economics before being transferred to the Fiji Institute of Technology in October as the Dean of the Faculty of Commerce, Hospitality and Tourism Studies.

In March 2009, he was appointed as the Chair of the Commerce Commission. In July 2014, he resigned as Commerce Commission director and from the Reserve Bank of Fiji board  chairman to join the FijiFirst party to contest in the elections.

Reddy was elected to Parliament in the 2014 election, in which he won 5,398 votes. He was appointed to Cabinet as Minister for Education, National Heritage, Culture and Arts in September 2014.

On 4 July 2017 Reddy appeared in court on charges of bribery and using undue influence over allegations he offered a water supply to a school in exchange for the school manager's vote. Due to this, he resigned from his post. However on December 2017, due to no conclusive evidence, those charges were dropped, and Reddy was appointed as the new minister for Ministry of Waterways.

He was re-elected in the 2022 election with 2654 votes. On 26 January 2023 Reddy resigned from Parliament. He was replaced as an MP by Penioni Ravunawa.

References

Indian members of the Parliament of Fiji
University of the South Pacific alumni
FijiFirst politicians
Agriculture ministers of Fiji
Education ministers of Fiji
Culture ministers of Fiji
Environment ministers of Fiji
Living people
Fijian politicians of Indian descent
Fijian Hindus
Year of birth missing (living people)
University of Hawaiʻi at Mānoa alumni
Fijian scientists
Academic staff of the University of the South Pacific
Academic staff of Fiji Institute of Technology
Fijian civil servants
Fijian economists